We Will is an outdoor 2005 welded stainless steel sculpture by Richard Hunt, installed in Chicago, in the U.S. state of Illinois.

See also
 2005 in art
 List of public art in Chicago

References

2005 establishments in Illinois
2005 sculptures
Outdoor sculptures in Chicago
Stainless steel sculptures in the United States